The 1998–99 Iowa State Cyclones men's basketball team represents Iowa State University during the 1998–99 NCAA Division I men's basketball season. The Cyclones were coached by Larry Eustachy, who was in his 1st season. They played their home games at Hilton Coliseum in Ames, Iowa and competed in the Big 12 Conference.

At the conclusion of the season Head Coach Tim Floyd accepted the same position with the Chicago Bulls of the NBA.  Iowa State hired Utah State Head Coach Larry Eustachy to replace him.

They finished the season 15–15, 6–10 in Big 12 play to finish in 9th place.  They lost to Colorado in the first round of the Big 12 Conference tournament.

Previous season

They finished the season 12–18, 5–11 in Big 12 play to finish in 11th place.  They lost to Missouri in the first round of the Big 12 Conference tournament.

The Cyclones saw individual success with Marcus Fizer being named a Freshman All-American by Basketball Times, Big 12 Freshman of the Year, and Big 12 Freshman of the Week four times.

After several seasons of courting the Chicago Bulls of the NBA hired Iowa State's Tim Floyd to replace Phil Jackson as head coach.  Iowa State hired Utah State Head Coach Larry Eustachy to replace him.

Offseason departures

Despite transferring into the program as sharp-shooters from junior colleges the previous year, both Delvin Washington and Jerry Curry transferred out after a single season citing lack of playing time from poor shooting.

After only playing four games during the 1997-98 season Lamont Sides transferred to Allegany College in Maryland.

Even though Andy Stensrud originally came to Iowa State on a basketball team he left the team after the 1997–98 season to join the football team.  After four years of football he would go on to play in the NFL.

Presesaon

Paul Shirley had a stress fracture in the off-season and had to sit out the 1998–99 season with a red-shirt.

Iowa State signed West Virginia Wesleyan transfer Dewayne Johns in the off season.  He struggled with the adjustment to student-athlete life and was kicked off the team during exhibition play.

Kantrail Horton transferred into the program mid-season from Middle Georgia JC but coach Eustacy elected to have him red-shirt to preserve his full two years of eligibility.

Preseason Poll

Incoming Players

Roster

Schedule and results

|-
!colspan=12 style=""|Exhibition

|-

|-
!colspan=12 style=""|Regular Season

|-

|-

|-

|-

|-

|-

|-

|-

|-

|-

|-

|-

|-

|-

|-

|-

|-

|-

|-

|-

|-

|-

|-

|-

|-

|-

|-

|-

|-
!colspan=12 style=""|Big 12 Tournament
|-

|-

Awards and honors

 All-Big 12 Selections

Marcus Fizer (Second Team)

 Academic All-Big 12

Klay Edwards (First Team)
Lamar Gregg (Second Team)

 Big-12 Player of the Week

Marcus Fizer (December 2nd)
Marcus Fizer (February 8th)

Ralph A. Olsen Award

Marcus Fizer

References

Iowa State Cyclones men's basketball seasons
Iowa State
Iowa State Cyc
Iowa State Cyc